Okoh may refer to:

Agnes Okoh (1905–1995), Nigerian Igbo who became a Christian evangelist
Chris Okoh (boxer) (born 1969), British cruiserweight boxer
Chris Okoh (footballer) (born 1976), Maltese footballer of Nigerian origin
Daniel Okoh, Nigerian President of the Organisation of African Instituted Churches
Matt Okoh (born 1972), US–Nigerian soccer player and coach
Nicholas Okoh (born 1952), Archbishop of Abuja Province, Primate of the Church of Nigeria
Nicolette Okoh (born 1964), Scottish singer-songwriter of Nigerian parentage
Theodosia Okoh (1922–2015), Ghanaian stateswoman, teacher and artist; designed Ghana's flag in 1957
Okoh Ebitu Ukiwe (born 1940), retired Commodore in the Nigerian Navy, Vice President of Nigeria 1985–86